Anarsia luticostella is a moth in the family Gelechiidae. It was described by Pierre Chrétien in 1915. It is found in Algeria.

References

luticostella
Moths described in 1915
Moths of Africa